The  is a streetcar line of Hiroshima Electric Railway (Hiroden) in Hiroshima, Japan. The line has been in operation since 1912. After the bombing of Hiroshima on August 6, 1945, the Ujina and Hiroden Honsha-mae lines were reopened after a month-long closure.

The total distance of the line is 5.7 kilometers. Routes 1, 3, 5 and 7 operate on the line. The line has 20 stations, numbered M9 (two stations at Kamiyachō) and U1 through U18.

Stations

References 

Ujina Line
Railway lines opened in 1912
1912 establishments in Japan